Saeid Rajabi (born 5 August 1996) is an Iranian heavyweight taekwondo competitor. He won gold medals at the 2016 Asian Championships and 2018 Asian Games.

References 

Iranian male taekwondo practitioners
1996 births
Living people
Asian Games gold medalists for Iran
Asian Games medalists in taekwondo
Taekwondo practitioners at the 2018 Asian Games
Medalists at the 2018 Asian Games
Universiade medalists in taekwondo
Universiade gold medalists for Iran
Asian Taekwondo Championships medalists
Medalists at the 2015 Summer Universiade
Medalists at the 2017 Summer Universiade
People from Mianeh
21st-century Iranian people